World Wide Renewal Program is a free download album released in 2008 by hip-hop label Chocolate Industries in collaboration with animation channel Adult Swim (via Williams Street Records) and Sonic.

Track list
Cool Kids – "88" (3:46)
Kovas – "Go That Route" (3:31)
Hollywood Holt – "Hollywood" (2:23)
Numeric – "Untitled" (2:08)
Diverse – "Escape Earth" (2:42)
Proton – "Good Guys" (4:09)
Via Tania – "On Sawyer" (4:15)
Diverse / Vast Aire – "Big Game" (3:58)
Push Button Objects – "Breakers Delight" (5:02)
Push Button Objects – "LXP Bitches" (3:03)
Free Moral Agents – "When I Smile" (4:25)

Videos
Two videos were released to promote the album. One for Hollywood by Hollywood Holt and a second animated video for the song Escape Earth by Diverse.

External links
 Official Album Page

2008 compilation albums
Albums free for download by copyright owner
Adult Swim compilation albums
Williams Street Records compilation albums
Sponsored compilation albums